The Whoopee Party is a Mickey Mouse short animated film first released on September 17, 1932. It was the 46th Mickey Mouse short, and the tenth of that year.

Plot
Mickey Mouse and friends have a party in which Minnie Mouse is playing the piano while Mickey, Goofy (then Dippy Dawg), and Horace Horsecollar are preparing some snacks. Meanwhile, a police group, who they have been called for an emergency recently, have also been invited to the party. This short was also featured in the House of Mouse episode "Dennis the Duck". The music is among others Scott Joplin's Maple Leaf Rag.

Production
The scene of Mickey dancing with Patricia Pigg was lifted from the 1930 short The Shindig.

Reception
 This short appeared on an episode of Disney's House of Mouse with burlap titles.
 In The Disney Films, critic Leonard Maltin says: "There is an incredible amount of action on the screen; an opening shot shows a score of couples dancing to the music. Later, when the party starts to jump, every single inch of picture is filled with dancing figures. What is more, nothing is out of bounds for joining the fun: a pair of shirts on the ironing board are as likely to get up and dance as any of the animals at the party."

Voice cast
 Mickey Mouse: Walt Disney
 Minnie Mouse: Marcellite Garner
 Goofy: Pinto Colvig
 Horace Horsecollar: Hubert Dobbs

Home media
The short was released on December 2, 2002, on Walt Disney Treasures: Mickey Mouse in Black and White.

See also
Mickey Mouse (film series)

References

External links
 

1932 films
1932 animated films
1932 musical comedy films
American musical comedy films
American black-and-white films
Films directed by Wilfred Jackson
Films produced by Walt Disney
Mickey Mouse short films
1930s Disney animated short films
Films about parties
1930s English-language films
1930s American films